Sore throat, also known as throat pain, is pain or irritation of the throat. Usually, causes of sore throat include:
 viral infections
 group A streptococcal infection (GAS) bacterial infection
 pharyngitis (inflammation of the throat)
 tonsillitis (inflammation of the tonsils), or dehydration, which leads to the throat drying up.

The majority of sore throats are caused by a virus, for which antibiotics are not helpful. A strong association between antibiotic misuse and antibiotic resistance has been shown.

For sore throat caused by bacteria (GAS), treatment with antibiotics may help the person get better faster, reduce the risk that the bacterial infection spreads, prevent retropharyngeal abscesses and quinsy, and reduce the risk of other complications such as rheumatic fever and rheumatic heart disease. In most developed countries, post-streptococcal diseases have become far less common. For this reason, awareness and public health initiatives to promote minimizing the use of antibiotics for viral infections has become the focus.

Approximately 35% of childhood sore throats and 5-25% of adults sore throats are caused by a bacterial infection from group A streptococcus. Sore throats that are "non-group A streptococcus" are assumed to be caused by a viral infection. Sore throat is a common reason for people to visit their primary care doctors and the top reason for antibiotic prescriptions by primary care practitioners such as family doctors. In the United States, about 1% of all visits to the hospital emergency department, physician office and medical clinics, and outpatient clinics are for sore throat (over 7 million visits for adults and 7 million visits for children per year).

Definition
A sore throat is pain felt anywhere in the throat.

Presentation
Symptoms of sore throat include:
 a scratchy sensation
 pain during swallowing
 discomfort while speaking
 a burning sensation
 swelling in the neck

Diagnosis
The most common cause (80%) is acute viral pharyngitis, a viral infection of the throat.  Other causes include other bacterial infections (such as group A streptococcus or streptococcal pharyngitis), trauma, and tumors. Gastroesophageal (acid) reflux disease can cause stomach acid to back up into the throat and also cause the throat to become sore. In children, streptococcal pharyngitis is the cause of 35–37% of sore throats.

The symptoms of a viral infection and a bacterial infection may be very similar. Some clinical guidelines suggest that the cause of a sore throat is confirmed prior to prescribing antibiotic therapy and only recommend antibiotics for children who are at high risk of non-suppurative complications. A group A streptococcus infection can be diagnosed by throat culture or a rapid test. In order to perform a throat culture, a sample from the throat (obtained by swabbing) is cultured (grown) on a blood agar plate to confirm the presence of group A streptococcus. Throat cultures are effective for people who have a low bacterial count (high sensitivity), however, throat cultures usually take about 48 hours to obtain the results.

Clinicians often also make treatment decisions based on the person's signs and symptoms alone. In the US, approximately 2/3rd of adults and half of children with sore throat are diagnosed based on symptoms and do not have testing for the presence of GAS to confirm a bacterial infection.

Rapid tests to detect GAS (bacteria) give a positive or negative result that is usually based on a colour change on a test strip that contains a throat swab (sample). Test strips detect a cell wall carbohydrate that is specific to GAS by using an immunologic reaction. Rapid testing can be performed in the doctors office and usually takes 5–10 minutes for the test strip to indicate the result. Specificity for most rapid tests is approximately 95%, however sensitivity is about 85%. Although the use of rapid testing has been linked with an overall reduction in antibiotic prescriptions, further research is necessary to understand other outcomes such as safety, and when the person starts to feel better.

Numerous clinical scoring systems (decision tools) have also been developed to support clinical decisions. Scoring systems that have been proposed include Centor's, McIsaac's, and the feverPAIN. A clinical scoring system is often used along with a rapid test. The scoring systems use observed signs and symptoms in order to determine the likelihood of a bacterial infection.

Management
Sore or scratchy throat can temporarily be relieved by gargling a solution of 1/4 to 1/2 teaspoon salt dissolved in an 8 ounce or 230 ml glass of water.

Pain medications such as non-steroidal anti-inflammatory drugs (NSAIDs) and paracetamol (acetaminophen) help in the management of pain. The use of corticosteroids seems to increase slightly the likelihood of resolution and the reduction of pain, but more analysis is necessary to ensure that  this minimal benefit outweighs the risks. Antibiotics probably reduce pain, diminish headaches and could prevent some sore throat complications; but, since these effects are small, they must be balanced with the threat of antimicrobial resistance.  It is not known whether antibiotics are effective for preventing recurrent sore throat.

There is an old wives tale that having a hot drink can help with common cold and influenza symptoms, including sore throat, but there is only limited evidence to support this idea. If the sore throat is unrelated to a cold and is caused by for example tonsillitis, a cold drink may be helpful.

There are also other medications like lozenges which can help people to cope with a sore throat.

Without active treatment, symptoms usually last two to seven days.

Statistics
In the United States, there are about 2.4 million emergency department visits with throat-related complaints per year.

References

External links 

Symptoms and signs: Respiratory system
Pain
Laryngology